Pittsburgh is the second largest city in Pennsylvania, U.S.

Pittsburgh may also refer to:

Places

Pennsylvania
East Pittsburgh, Pennsylvania, a borough in Allegheny County, Pennsylvania
Pittsburgh Coalfield
Pittsburgh Field Club
Pittsburgh International Airport
Pittsburgh Landmarks (disambiguation)
Pittsburgh metropolitan area, for the region encompassing the city
University of Pittsburgh

Other places
Birmingham, Alabama, nicknamed the "Pittsburgh of the South"
Pittsburgh, Atlanta, Georgia, US
Pittsburgh, Kingston, Ontario, Canada
Pittsburgh Channel, Ontario, Canada
Pittsburgh Historic District (disambiguation)

Sports
Pittsburgh Americans, an American Football League (1936–1937)
Pittsburgh Associates
Pittsburgh Condors, an  American Basketball Association team from 1967–1972
Pittsburgh drug trials, the first drug crisis in Major League Baseball
Pittsburgh Hardhats (disambiguation)
Pittsburgh Hornets, an American minor-league hockey team from 1936–1967
Pittsburgh Keystones (disambiguation)
Pittsburgh Marathon
Pittsburgh Maulers (disambiguation)
Pittsburgh Panthers, the athletic program of the University of Pittsburgh
Pittsburgh Penguins, a National Hockey League team
Pittsburgh Phantoms (disambiguation)
Pittsburgh Pirates, a Major League Baseball team
Pittsburgh Pirates (disambiguation)
Pittsburgh Power, an Arena Football League
Pittsburgh Stars, championship football team in the original NFL (1900–02)
Pittsburgh Steelers, National Football League
Pittsburgh Vintage Grand Prix, a motor sports car race

Arts and entertainment
Pittsburgh (1942 film), with Marlene Dietrich, Randolph Scott, and John Wayne
Pittsburgh (2006 film), a film starring Jeff Goldblum
"Pittsburgh" (Weeds), an episode of the TV series Weeds
"Pittsburgh, Pennsylvania" (song), a 1952 popular song written by Bob Merrill
"Pittsburgh Town" or "Pittsburgh", a 1941 folk song written by Woody Guthrie and recorded by Pete Seeger
Pittsburgh (album), by Ahmad Jamal
Pittsburgh Landscape, a 1954 abstract sculpture by David Smith

Naval vessels
USS Pittsburgh (1861), an ironclad gunboat
USS Pittsburgh (CA-4), originally USS Pennsylvania (ACR-4), an armored cruiser
USS Pittsburgh (CA-72), a Baltimore-class heavy cruiser
USS Pittsburgh (SSN-720), a Los Angeles-class submarine

People
Pittsburgh crime family
Pittsburgh Slim, rap artist
"Pittsburgh Phil" (Harry Strauss; 1909–1941), mobster and member of Murder Inc.
"Pittsburgh Phil" (George E. Smith; 1862–1905), gambler

Transportation
Pittsburgh Line, a line of the Norfolk Southern Railway
Pittsburgh Pike, an early toll road
Pittsburgh Railways
Pittsburgh Subdivision, a railroad line

Other uses
Pittsburgh (Hasidic dynasty), founded in Pittsburgh
2009 G20 Pittsburgh summit, a meeting of the G20 countries in Pittsburgh, Philadelphia
Miss Pittsburgh, an early airmail plane
Pittsburgh Tools, a line of tools made and sold by Harbor Freight Tools

See also

Pittsburgh shooting (disambiguation)
Pittsburgh station (disambiguation)
Diocese of Pittsburgh (disambiguation)
Metropolis of Pittsburgh (disambiguation)
484 Pittsburghia, an asteroid
Pitsburg, Ohio
Pitt (disambiguation)
Pittsburg (disambiguation)
West Pittsburg (disambiguation)